This is a list of Honorary Fellows of Wolfson College, Cambridge. A full list is available at 

 Cristina Bicchieri
 Sir Leszek Borysiewicz
 William Brown
 Lawrence Collins, Baron Collins of Mapesbury
 Suzanne Cory
 David Crystal
 William H. Gates Sr.
 Sir David Grant
 Anthony Green
 Sir Michael Hardie Boys

References

Fellows of Wolfson College, Cambridge
Wolfson College, Cambridge
Wolfson College